Salt Lake City Air Route Traffic Control Center (ZLC) (radio communications "Salt Lake Center") is one of 22  FAA Area Control Centers in the United States. It is located in Salt Lake City, Utah, adjacent to Salt Lake City International Airport. It was opened in 1939 and was originally located on the third floor of the old Salt Lake City International Airport terminal. The Salt Lake Center (ZLC) covers one of the largest geographical areas of any other control center, totaling approximately 350,000 squares miles.

The primary responsibility of Salt Lake City Center is sequencing and separation of over-flights, arrivals, and departures in order to provide safe, orderly, and expeditious flow of aircraft flying under instrument flight rules (IFR).

References

External links
Salt Lake City Center Weather Service Unit (CWSU) (NWS/FAA)

Air traffic control centers
Air traffic control in the United States
Aviation in Utah
Traffic Control Center